Hook Point (Indigenous name: Torerr) is the southernmost tip of Fraser Island (also known as K'Gari and Gari) in Queensland, Australia. It is the landing point for ferry services from Inskip Point, which is some 1,200 meters further south.

References

Headlands of Queensland
Fraser Island